Strasburg is a village in Shelby County, Illinois, United States. The population was 467 at the 2010 census.

Geography
Strasburg is located at  (39.351486, -88.619364).

Demographics

As of the census of 2000, there were 603 people, 208 households, and 139 families residing in the village. The racial makeup of the village was 100.00% White. Hispanic or Latino of any race were 0.17% of the population.

There were 208 households, out of which 29.8% had children under the age of 18 living with them, 59.6% were married couples living together, 4.8% had a female householder with no husband present, and 32.7% were non-families. 30.3% of all households were made up of individuals, and 17.3% had someone living alone who was 65 years of age or older. The average household size was 2.40 and the average family size was 3.04.

In the village, the population was spread out, with 19.9% under the age of 18, 5.1% from 18 to 24, 21.6% from 25 to 44, 19.7% from 45 to 64, and 33.7% who were 65 years of age or older. The median age was 49 years. For every 100 females, there were 79.5 males. For every 100 females age 18 and over, there were 76.3 males.

The median income for a household in the village was $40,673, and the median income for a family was $43,750. Males had a median income of $28,750 versus $21,313 for females. The per capita income for the village was $16,102. About 6.0% of families and 6.0% of the population were below the poverty line, including 5.6% of those under age 18 and 9.0% of those age 65 or over.

References

Further reading
 - History of the village's first 100 years

External links 

 

Villages in Shelby County, Illinois
Villages in Illinois